Oechalia (ancient Greek: Οἰχαλία) may refer to:

places
Oechalia (Aetolia), a town of ancient Aetolia, Greece
Oechalia (Arcadia), a town of ancient Arcadia, Greece
Oechalia (Euboea), a town of ancient Euboea, Greece
Oechalia (Messenia), a town of ancient Messenia, Greece
Oechalia (Thessaly), a town of ancient Thessaly, Greece
Oechalia (Trachis), a town of Trachis, ancient Thessaly, Greece
Oichalia (disambiguation), one of several modern places in Greece

other
Capture of Oechalia, an epic poem relating to an unknown Oechalia among the ancient towns above